Jarosław Jakub Szymczyk (born 21 March 1970 in Katowice) is a Polish police officer, Inspector General of the Police, and Commander-in-Chief of the Police in Poland since 2016.

His police career started in 1990. In the years 2007–2008 he was the provincial police commander in Rzeszów. In 2008–2012, he was the deputy provincial police commander in Katowice. In 2012–2015, he was the provincial police commander in Kielce, and in the years 2015–2016, the provincial police commander in Katowice.

In 2022, he was involved in an incident in which a Ukrainian grenade launcher he had been given as a gift exploded in his office, leading to his being hospitalised with minor injuries.

References 

Polish police officers
Living people
1970 births